Wang Yajun (born 27 August 1962) is a Chinese former volleyball player who competed in the 1988 Summer Olympics.

References

1962 births
Living people
Chinese women's volleyball players
Olympic volleyball players of China
Volleyball players at the 1988 Summer Olympics
Olympic bronze medalists for China
Olympic medalists in volleyball
Medalists at the 1988 Summer Olympics
20th-century Chinese women